The Powder River Massacre, part of the Powder River Expedition, occurred on August 17, 1865, and was carried out by United States soldiers and Pawnee scouts against 24 Cheyenne people. The incident occurred near the Powder River in Dakota Territory, in present-day Johnson County, Wyoming.

The massacre 
In August, 1865, Captain Frank Joshua North, along with about 48 of his Pawnee Scouts and several other soldiers and civilians, was keeping up a vigilant search for "Hostile Indians" in Dakota Territory. For two days, the group trailed a band of Cheyenne who were heading north. The trail showed that the Cheyennes had about 35-40 horses and mules, along with one travois. At 2:00 a.m. on August 17, the Captain and his Scouts caught up with the group on the Powder River, about 60 miles north of Fort Connor. The small group of 24 Cheyennes had made their camp for the night, and were asleep. North decided to wait until dawn to attack. In the morning, Captain North's party closed in on the camp. Spotting the scouts, the Cheyenne thought the approaching Indians were not Pawnee but friendly Cheyenne, and made no hostile moves. However, the Pawnees suddenly charged in on the Cheyenne, surprising them and killing all 24, including Yellow Woman, who was the stepmother of George Bent. In the fighting, North's scouts lost 4 horses killed, but captured two stolen government saddles, a quantity of white women's and children's clothing, two U.S. Infantry coats issued by Colonel Thomas Moonlight to the Indians in the spring of 1865, and 29 horses and mules. Four of these animals had U.S. government brands showing they had recently been captured in the Battles of Red Buttes and Platte Bridge Station that had both occurred on July 26, 1865 near present-day Casper, Wyoming. One captured horse also belonged to the Overland Stage company.

Aftermath 
After the skirmish, Brigadier General Patrick E. Connor issued an official report on the action dated August 19, 1865. It read as follows:

The location 
The estimates of where the massacre happened vary from fifty to eighty miles north of Fort Connor, according to the various diaries and reports. It most likely took place somewhere between the mouth of Crazy Woman Creek and present-day Arvada, Wyoming on the Powder River. The site of the graves of the 24 Cheyennes who were killed remains unknown.

Order of battle 
United States Army, Captain Frank Joshua North
 Pawnee Scouts, about 48 men.
 Unattached soldiers and civilians, about 4 men

Native Americans, Yellow Woman †
 Cheyenne, 24 men and women

References

Powder River 1865
1865 in the United States
Dakota Territory
Pre-statehood history of Wyoming
Powder River 1865
August 1865 events